The Ministry of Economy and Finance of Guinea is a department of the Government of Guinea in charge of public finances of Guinea.

Responsibilities 
The Ministry of Economy and Finance is charged with the General planning and administration of political economy and finances of the government as well as the maintenance of the heritage of the Republic. More precisely, the specific missions of the Ministry are:
 to conceive, detail and put into action the policy of the Government regarding public finances.
 to develop and oversee the application of the regulation of for-profit games.
 to ensure the mobilization of non-tax revenue.
 to develop and ensure the application of public procurement regulations
 to ensure the collection, analysis and dissemination of economic and financial information
 to represent the State in negotiations with development partners and to sign financial conventions and agreements
 to define the public debt policy and ensure its regulation
 to ensure the control of public finance management
 to ensure the supervision of the financial holdings of the State
 to ensure the financial supervision of public enterprises and of those with public participation
 to participate in the promotion of private investments
 to participate in the development of the financial regulation system
 to participate in diagnostic and outlook studies allowing the design, development, monitoring and evaluation of public policies
 to participate in the development of finance laws and the oversight of their execution
 To participate in the setting of monetary and exchange rate policy objectives in collaboration with the monetary authorities
 to consider the environmental dimension in the sector's programs and projects
 to promote gender equity in the sector's programs and projects

Organization 
The Ministry of Economy and Finance consists of:
 a Secretary General
 a Cabinet
 Support Services
 National Directorates
 Related Services
 Public Programs and Projects
 Deconcentrated Services
 an Advisory Body
The Cabinet consists of:
 a Chef de Cabinet
 a legal advisor
 an advisor in charge of monetary and economic questions
 a Public Finance Advisor
 an Advisor in charge of state policy
 an attache de Cabinet
Support Services consist of:
 The General Finance Inspectorate
 The Strategy and Development Office
 The Documentation and Archives Center
 The Communications and External Relations Unit
 The Information Systems Modernization Service
 The Gender and Equity Service
 The Hygiene, Health and Safety Service
 The Human Resources Division
 The Financial Affairs Division
 The Central Secretariat
 The Reception and Information Service
 The Technical Program Monitoring Unit
 The Training Service
The National Directorates are
 The National Directorate of Economic Studies and Forecasts
 The National Directorate of the Treasury and Public Accounts
 The National Directorate of Public Procurement
 The National Directorate of Debt and Public Development Assistance
 The National Directorate of Financial Control
 The National Directorate of Public Heritage and Private Investments

Ministers of Economy and Finance
Alioune Dramé, 1958 – 1960 – ?
Diawadou Barry,? – 1961 – 1963
Moussa Diakité, January 1963 – February 1964
Saifoulaye Diallo, February 1964 – May 1969
Ousmane Baldé, ? – ?
Ismael Toure, May 1969 – June 1972
Mamadou Béla Doumbouya, 1972
Fode Mamadou Touré, 1972 – March 1984
Kémoko Keita, 1984 – 1985
Sory Doumbouya, 1985 – ?
Lamine Bolivogui, ? – 1986 – 1989
Edouard Benjamin, 1989 – 1992
Soriba Kaba, 1992 – August 1994
Ibrahima Camara, August 1994 – July 1996
Ousmane Kaba, 1996 – 1998
Ibrahima Kassory Fofana, 1998 – 2000
Cheick Amadou Camara, 2000 – 2004
Madikaba Camara, 2004 – 2007
Ousmane Dore, 2007 – 2008
Karamokoba Camara, 2008
Mamadou Sande, 2009 – 2010
Kerfalla Yansané, 2010 – 2014
Mohamed Diaré, 2014 – 2016
Malado Kaba, 2016 – 2018
Mamadi Camara, 2018 -2021
Lanciné Condé, 2021–

See also
 Government of Guinea
 Economy of Guinea
 Ministry of Budget (Guinea)
 Banque Centrale de la République de Guinée
 Ministry of Investments and Public-Private Partnerships (Guinea)

References 

Economy and Finance
Guinea
Guinea
Economy of Guinea
1958 establishments in Guinea